Welcome to the Jang House is the second studio album by the Philadelphian rap group, Plastic Little. The album was released on the September 28, 2008, through Half Time Records. The album compiles tracks from their self-released album, Thug Paradise, as well as their debut album, She's Mature; adding a couple of new tracks also.

The album contains samples from a wide variety of sources, ranging from the Michael Jackson song "Thriller" sampled in "Cheap Thrills"; to The Smiths song "Heaven Knows I'm Miserable Now" in "Holla Plastique"; and even "A Whole New World" by Peabo Bryson and Regina Belle, as featured in Disneys Aladdin, in "Driz Hollering".

Track listing

Reception

The album received mainly positive reviews, with critics praising Little's ability to blend many genres together into one album while still sounding "fresh and bold"; their "tongue-in-cheek brilliance"; and their "biting critique of society at large" and "acerbic wit and intelligence". Ron ONeill, of online music magazine Subba-Cultcha gave the album a perfect score and stated that this album was "Easily one of the freshest rap albums to appear in the last few years. A clever and well-defined collection of electro, Philly house, hip-hop, wit and sampling".

Samples
 "Cheap Thrills"
 Michael Jackson - "Thriller"
 "Holla Plastique"
 The Smiths - "Heaven Knows I'm Miserable Now"
 "The Jumpoff"
 "Wade in the Water"
 "Driz Hollering"
 Peabo Bryson & Regina Belle - "A Whole New World"
 "Sugar"
 The Archies - "Sugar, Sugar"

Credits

Vocals - Jayson Musson, Jon Folmar, Kurt Hunte
Beats - Michael Stern
Mixing - Si Young

References

2008 albums
Hip hop albums by American artists
Plastic Little (band) albums